Dirk Bootsma (23 May 1936 – 5 October 2020) was a Dutch geneticist. He was a professor at the Erasmus University Rotterdam between 1969 and 2002. He and his research group discovered the cause of chronic myelogenous leukemia and furthered the understanding of the nucleotide excision repair.

Career
Bootsma was born on 23 May 1936. He started his study of biology at Utrecht University in September 1953. He did his first DNA-research under professor Winkler. In 1965 he obtained his PhD under Jacob A. Cohen from Leiden University with a thesis titled: "De invloed van röntgenstraling op de delingscyclus van in vitro gekweekte cellen". In the late 1960s Bootsma performed his compulsory military service at the Medical-Biological Laboratory of the Netherlands Organisation for Applied Scientific Research (TNO). There, he researched the influence of X-radiation on chromosomes in living cells.

After obtaining his PhD, Bootsma joined the newly founded department of cell biology and genetics at the Erasmus University Rotterdam. In 1969, he became a professor of genetics. After recombinant DNA became available, Bootsma and his department made use of this technology. In 1974 he organized the second Human Gene Mapping Conference in Noordwijkerhout. Bootsma later lost his interest in gene mapping. He then turned to cancer research, relying on his earlier experiences at TNO. He focused on mechanisms that repaired DNA, especially in rare forms of skin cancer, and discovered several proteins in this field. Bootsma had a special interest in chromosome 22, which was recently discovered to be involved in chronic myelogenous leukemia. In 1982, the research team of Bootsma discovered the cause of this specific type of blood cancer: two broken chromosomes (9 and 22) which were attached mistakenly reattached to the other, leading to the Philadelphia chromosome.

Another topic on which Bootsma furthered research from his time at TNO was DNA repair. He set up research into genetic disorders, especially xeroderma pigmentosum (XP). For this research Bootsma used human cells, being one of the first in the Netherlands to do so. With the developing of technology, especially the possibility to insert foreign DNA into humans and the discovery of recombinant DNA, Bootsma was able to further his study of XP. In 1984 his group was able to clone the repair gene ERCC1. When ERCC3 was also cloned this led to a solution for DNA repair in XP-patients by inserting them in their fibroblasts, leading to an overall furthered  understanding of the nucleotide excision repair.

Bootsma retired in October 2002, he was succeeded as group research leader by Jan Hoeijmakers.

Bootsma died on 5 October 2020, aged 84.

Honours and distinctions
Bootsma was elected a member of the European Molecular Biology Organization in 1976. He was elected a member of the Royal Netherlands Academy of Arts and Sciences in 1983. Bootsma was elected a member of the Academia Europaea in 1991.

Bootsma and Jan Hoeijmakers won the 1995 Louis-Jeantet Prize for Medicine. In 1996 Bootsma held the Rogier Soher Lecture of the International Agency for Research on Cancer. In 2000 he won the Mauro Baschirotto Award of the European Society of Human Genetics. In 2009 Bootsma's discovery of the relation between chronic myelogenous leukemia and the Philadelphia chromosome was incorporated in the Dutch canon of medicine.

References

1936 births
2020 deaths
Dutch geneticists
Academic staff of Erasmus University Rotterdam
Leiden University alumni
Members of Academia Europaea
Members of the European Molecular Biology Organization
Members of the Royal Netherlands Academy of Arts and Sciences
Utrecht University alumni